was a Japanese mathematician of the Edo period. He was the lord of Kurume Domain.

References

Further reading

1714 births
1783 deaths
18th-century Japanese mathematicians
Daimyo